Hamad Aladwani is a paralympic athlete from Kuwait competing mainly in category T53 sprint events.

Hamad competed in the 2000 Summer Paralympics winning bronze in the 100m but missing out on medals in the 200m and 400m.  2004 proved to be his best year when winning gold in the 400m and silver in both the 100m and 200m.  He was unable to follow this up in 2008 and missed out on medals in all three sprints.

References

Paralympic athletes of Kuwait
Athletes (track and field) at the 2000 Summer Paralympics
Athletes (track and field) at the 2004 Summer Paralympics
Athletes (track and field) at the 2008 Summer Paralympics
Athletes (track and field) at the 2012 Summer Paralympics
Paralympic gold medalists for Kuwait
Paralympic silver medalists for Kuwait
Paralympic bronze medalists for Kuwait
Kuwaiti wheelchair racers
Living people
Medalists at the 2000 Summer Paralympics
Medalists at the 2004 Summer Paralympics
Year of birth missing (living people)
Paralympic medalists in athletics (track and field)
20th-century Kuwaiti people
21st-century Kuwaiti people